Amritsar Cantonment is a cantonment town in Amritsar District in the state of Punjab, India.

Demographics
 India census, Amritsar Cantonment had a population of 11,300. Males constitute 63% of the population and females 37%. Amritsar Cantonment has an average literacy rate of 81%, higher than the national average of 59.5%; with 66% of the males and 34% of females literate. 11% of the population is under 6 years of age.

References

Cantonments of India
Cities and towns in Amritsar district